Charles Mensah (Arabic: تشارلز منساه) was a Gabonese filmmaker, screenwriter and production manager. Popularly known as "The Gentleman of African Cinemas", Mensah contributed in several critically acclaimed documentaries including Équateur, Les Couilles de l'éléphant and Lybek, the crunch of the alive. He worked as an activist for the development of independent southern cinema for a career spanned more than three decades.

Personal life
He was born on 1948 in Omboué, Gabon. He died on 3 June 2011, at the age of 63.

Career
In 1976, he made his first fiction, Obali co-produced with Pierre-Marie Ndong. Then in 1977 he made the second venture Ayouma co-produced with Ndong and Patience Dabany. With the success at film making, Mensah got involved in production, this time with the film Équateur, signed Serge Gainsbourg. Along with renowned filmmaker Henri-Joseph Koumba Bididi in 1995, Mensah involved in the television serial L'Auberge du Salut, a full Gabonese film.

As executive producer, Mensah participated in numerous productions including: Le Damier de Balufu Bakupu Kanyinda in 1996, Dôlè (l'Argent) by Imunga Iwanga in 2000, Les Couilles de l'éléphant in 2001 and N'Djamena City directed by Issa Serge Coelo in 2006. He also involved in short documentary on Lybek, le crunch du vivant. Until 2009, he held the position of Director General of the National Center of Gabonese Cinema (CENACI), which is currently known as Gabonese Institute of Image and Sound (IGIS). In the same year, he became the president of Pan-African Federation of Filmmakers (FEPACI) as well as in Film Assistance Fund Commission of the International Francophone Organization. In 2011, he worked in Bididi's Le collier du Makoko which gained international recognition including Cannes inclusion.

Filmography

References

External links
 
 CINEMA / DOCUMENTARY ESCALS OF LIBREVILLE (EDL): WHAT ABOUT THE 2016 EDITION?

1976 births
2011 deaths
Documentary film directors
Gabonese film directors
People from Ogooué-Maritime Province
21st-century Gabonese people